American trial lawyer associations are non-profit, professional associations/organizations located throughout the United States. These organizations host attorney education events (such as continuing legal education classes), monitor relevant changes in the law, and advocate for greater access to the civil justice system.

National
American Association for Justice
Alabama
Alabama Association for Justice
Alaska
Alaska Association for Justice  
Arizona
Arizona Association for Justice
Arkansas
Arkansas Trial Lawyers Association
California
Alameda-Contra Costa Trial Lawyers Association
Association of Business Trial Lawyers San Diego
Capitol City Trial Lawyers Association
Consumer Attorneys Association of Los Angeles
Consumer Attorneys of California
Consumer Attorneys of San Diego
Criminal Trial Lawyers Association of Northern California
Northern California Association of Business Trial Lawyers
Orange County Trial Lawyers Association
San Francisco Trial Lawyers Association
San Mateo County Trial Lawyers Association
Colorado
Colorado Trial Lawyers Association
Connecticut
Connecticut Trial Lawyers Association
Delaware
Delaware Trial Lawyers Association
District of Columbia
International Trade Commission Trial Lawyers Association
Trial Lawyers Association of Metro Washington D.C.
Florida
Association of Defense Trial Attorneys
Central Florida Trial Lawyers Association
Florida Justice Association
Miami-Dade Trial Lawyers Association Board
Palm Beach County Justice Association
Tampa Bay Trial Lawyers Association
Georgia
Georgia Trial Lawyers Association
Hawaii
Hawaii Association for Justice
Idaho
Idaho Trial Lawyers Association
Illinois
Illinois Trial Lawyers Association
Indiana
Indiana Trial Lawyers Association
Iowa
Iowa Association for Justice
Kansas
Kansas Association for Justice
Kentucky
Kentucky Justice Association
Louisiana
Louisiana Association for Justice
Maine
Maine Trial Lawyers Association
Maryland
Maryland Association for Justice
Massachusetts
Massachusetts Academy of Trial Attorneys
Michigan
Michigan Association for Justice
Minnesota
Minnesota Association for Justice
Mississippi
Mississippi Association for Justice
Missouri
Missouri Association of Trial Attorneys
Montana
Montana Defense Trial Lawyers Association
Montana Trial Lawyers Association
Nebraska
Nebraska Association of Trial Attorneys
Nevada
Nevada Justice Association
Western Trial Lawyers Association
New Hampshire
New Hampshire Association for Justice
New Jersey
New Jersey Association for Justice
New Mexico
New Mexico Trial Lawyers Association & Foundation
New York
NYS Academy of Trial Lawyers
New York State Trial Lawyers Association
North Carolina
North Carolina Advocates for Justice
North Dakota
North Dakota Association for Justice
Ohio
Ohio Association for Justice
Oklahoma
Oklahoma Association for Justice
Oregon
Oregon Trial Lawyers Association
Pennsylvania
Pennsylvania Association for Justice
Philadelphia Trial Lawyers Association
Western Pennsylvania Trial Lawyers Association
Rhode Island
Rhode Island Association for Justice
South Carolina
South Carolina Association for Justice
South Carolina Defense Trial Attorneys Association
South Dakota
South Dakota Trial Lawyers Association
Tennessee
Tennessee Association for Justice
Texas
Capital Area Trial Lawyers Association
Dallas Trial Lawyers Association
Houston Trial Lawyers Association
San Antonio Trial Lawyers Association
Tarrant County Trial Lawyers Association
Texas Trial Lawyers Association
Utah
Utah Association for Justice
Vermont
Vermont Association for Justice
Virginia
Virginia Trial Lawyers Association
Washington
Washington State Association for Justice
West Virginia
West Virginia Association for Justice
Wisconsin
Wisconsin Association for Justice
Wyoming
Wyoming Trial Lawyers Association

References